Eric Carmen is the fifth album by rock and roll musician Eric Carmen. It was also his second self-titled LP after the 1975 album of the same name.

The album spent ten weeks on the U.S. Billboard album charts and reached its peak position of #128 in early March 1985. It contained one Top 40 hit single, "I Wanna Hear It from Your Lips," which peaked at #35 on the Billboard Hot 100 in the same month.  The song was also a medium adult contemporary hit in both the United States (#10) and Canada (#17).  "Spotlight" was featured as the B side of the 45 RPM.

"I'm Through With Love" was a minor follow-up hit in the U.S., reaching #87 on Billboard.

In 2016, the album was reissued on Varese Vintage, and featured as bonus tracks the 7" Single remix and the 12" version of "I Wanna Hear It From Your Lips".

In 1985, country singer Louise Mandrell covered "Maybe My Baby."  Her version reached #8 on the U.S. Country singles chart.

Track listing 
All songs written and arranged by Eric Carmen except where indicated.

 "I Wanna Hear It from Your Lips" (Carmen, Dean Pitchford) – 3:17
 "I'm Through with Love" – 4:04
 "American as Apple Pie" (Carmen, Dean Pitchford) – 3:46
 "Living Without Your Love" (Michael Bolton, Doug James) – 4:07
 "Come Back to My Love" (Bob Gaudio, Jerry Corbetta, John Bettis) – 3:38
 "She Remembered"  - 4:31
 "You Took Me All the Way" – 3:36
 "Maybe My Baby" – 3:39
 "Spotlight" – 4:13
 "The Way We Used to Be" – 3:16

Personnel 
 Eric Carmen – lead and backing vocals, acoustic piano, keyboards, synthesizers, harpsichord, guitars, drums, arrangements 
 Richard Reising – synthesizers, harpsichord, guitars, backing vocals 
 George Sipl – keyboards, synthesizers, organ, backing vocals 
 Dan Hrdlicka – guitars, backing vocals 
 Steve Knill – bass, backing vocals
 Dwight Krueger – drums, percussion, backing vocals 
 Michael McBride – drums, percussion, backing vocals

Production 
 Bob Gaudio – producer (1, 2, 5-10)
 Don Gehman – remixing (1, 2, 7), producer (3, 4), engineer 
 Jim Bell – engineer 
 Tony D'Amico – engineer 
 Dale Peters – engineer 
 Arnie Rosenberg – engineer 
 Michael Wagener – mixing (6)
 Greg Fulginiti – mastering 
 Elaine Black – production coordinator 
 Roz Schrank – production coordinator 
 Tommy Steele – art direction, design 
 Victoria Pearson – photography 
 Mastered at Artisan Sound Recorders

2016 reissue 
 Bob Gaudio – producer
 Cary E. Mansfeld – producer 
 Bill Pitzonka – producer, art direction 
 Larry R. Watts – producer, liner notes 
 Don Gehman – remixing (11)
 John "Jellybean" Benitez – remixing (12)
 Michael Hutchinson – mixing (12)
 Melanie West – assistant engineer (12)
 Chas Ferry – CD mastering 
 Jimmy Bralower – additional drum programming (12)
 Bashiri Johnson – percussion (12)

Notes 

Eric Carmen albums
1984 albums
Albums produced by Don Gehman
Geffen Records albums
Albums produced by Bob Gaudio